Eliaser Tuhadeleni (1 January 1918 – 1997) also known as Kaxumba Kandola was a Namibian anti-apartheid activist, guerrilla fighter and political prisoner. He was one of the co-founders of the Ovamboland People's Congress in Cape Town, South Africa and became one of the first participants of the Namibian liberation struggle. Kaxumba Kandola took part in the battle of Omugulugwombashe which was the first battle of the Namibian War of Independence. 

He evaded arrest but was eventually caught and sent to Pretoria Central Prison where he was charged under the Terrorism Act of 1967.

Early life 
Kaxumba Kandola was born at Omatangela village in northern Namibia, a year after the British-South African forces conquered Oukwanyama kingdom. His father, Lyaalala ya Tuhadeleni, was one of the senior headmen of Oukwanyama King Mandume Ya Ndemufayo. The Tuhadeleni household is based in Omanyoshe village in Endola Constituency, Ohangwena Region.

Political career
In 1943, Kaxumba Kandola got involved in political activities as a member of the Mandume Movement. He was involved in workers' strike at the Kranzberg Mine, near Omaruru. Then, Kaxumba closely worked with the Anglican priest, Theophilus Hamutumbangela, writing petitions and sending them to the colonial administration and to the United Nations, complaining about the ill-treatment migrant workers  received.

In the mid 1950s, Kaxumba left Namibia for South Africa. He was one of the first Namibians to work in Cape Town through the contract labour system. He became a member of the "Barber Shop Crew" which was instrumental in forming the Ovamboland People's Congress(OPC) in 1957. The following year, the leader of OPC, Andimba Toivo ya Toivo, send a petition to the United Nations through Mburumba Kerina and Michael Scott, based in the United States, complaining about the human rights abuses of the contract labour system and the unlawful occupation of South West Africa by the apartheid government of South Africa. This led to a mass deportation of Namibian contract workers from Cape Town. Kaxumba was one of those who would later be deported from the city.

In 1959, the OPC was formally constituted into the Ovamboland People's Organization (OPO), Kaxumba became one of its leaders in Ovamboland where he held meetings with local people known as Oyoongi ya Kaxumba - "Kaxumba's rallies", he used these meetings to mobilize and educate them about colonial resistance. Following the transformation of OPO into the South West Africa People's Organization (SWAPO) in 1960 many of its leaders went into exile to lobby for support from the international community and to pursue the arms liberation struggle. Kaxumba remained in the country as one of the main leaders, his house was raided a couple of times and was used to hold important SWAPO meetings by the internal leaders. He eventually went into exile in 1965 to take part in the preparation of the arms liberation struggle with the newly created People's Liberation Army of Namibia (PLAN). In 1966 when one of the first of PLAN guerrilla units arrived in Ovamboland, they stayed at Kaxumba's home for several months before moving off to set up a camp at Omugulugwombashe. 

After the attack on Omugulugwombashe, the South African regime arrested SWAPO leaders including Andimba Toivo ya Toivo and other members of the Peoples Liberation Army of Namibia, they searched for Kaxumba for months before they were able to capture him.

He was eventually arrested and taken to Pretoria. He then became Accused No. 1 in the trial, The State v. Tuhadeleni and 36 Others, under South Africa's Terrorism Act of 21 June 1967. Ephraim Kapolo died during the trial in Pretoria while Kaxumba and twenty nine other Namibians were sentenced to Robben Island. He was one of those who received a life sentence. When Kaxumba spoke at his trial just before being sentenced to a life term on Robin Island he remained defiant and unbroken. Addressing the court he said: "David slew Goliath because he had right on his side, and we Namibians have faith that we, too, have right on our side."

Tuhadeleni spent 18 years in prison until his eventual release in 1985. Namibia gained independence on 21 March 1990.

Death
Kaxumba lived to see the fruits of his labour and the independence of his country. He died in November 1997 in Windhoek.

References

1918 births
1997 deaths
Inmates of Robben Island
People's Liberation Army of Namibia personnel
Colonial people in German South West Africa
Namibian people imprisoned abroad